is a Japanese former professional baseball player from Kashihara, Nara, Japan. He was a starting pitcher for the Yokohama DeNA BayStars from 1992 through 2016.

Playing career

Yokohama DeNa BayStars

Miura was drafted 6th in the 1991 Nippon Professional Baseball draft by the Yokohama Taiyo Whales. He made his professional debut against the Yomiuri Giants on October 7, 1992, retiring six straight batters in relief.

In 2005, he led the Central League in strikeouts (177) and ERA (2.52).  Miura became a free agent after an injury-plagued 2008 season.  Both the BayStars and the Hanshin Tigers, the team that he had rooted for as a child, offered him contracts.  Miura decided to return to the BayStars, who offered him a 4-year contract  worth 1 billion yen (approximately US$10 million), as opposed to the Tigers, who were offering three years and 900 million yen.  Miura's contract was renewed for the 2014 season at 180 million Yen (approximately US$1.75 million).

Miura is known for his success against the Tigers in his career.  Even in his worst seasons, Miura has had some of his best games against the Tigers, particularly at Koshien Stadium. 

His nickname is "Hama no Banchō". This means "Boss of [Yoko]hama".

Olympic career

Miura pitched for Japan in the 2004 Summer Olympics, and helped the team win a bronze medal.

Coaching career

In 2019, the Yokohama DeNA BayStars hired Miura as pitching coach.

In 2020, Miura was hired as the Manager of the Yokohama DeNA BayStars minor league team.

In 2021, Miura became manager of the BayStars' main team, replacing Alex Ramirez.

Pitching style

Miura throws a fastball in the high 80s and also utilizes a slider, forkball, shuuto, curveball, and cutter. He is known for working both sides of the plate.

References

External links

 NPB.com

1973 births
Living people
People from Kashihara, Nara
Baseball people from Nara Prefecture
Yokohama Taiyō Whales players
Yokohama BayStars players
Yokohama DeNA BayStars players
Yokohama DeNA BayStars managers
Baseball players at the 2004 Summer Olympics
Olympic baseball players of Japan
Olympic bronze medalists for Japan
Olympic medalists in baseball
Managers of baseball teams in Japan
Medalists at the 2004 Summer Olympics